Blyth is a civil parish in the Bassetlaw District of Nottinghamshire, England.  The parish contains 53 listed buildings that are recorded in the National Heritage List for England.   Of these, three are listed at Grade I, the highest of the three grades, and the others are at Grade II, the lowest grade.  The parish contains the village of Blyth and the surrounding countryside.  To the north of the village is the country house Serlby Hall, which is listed, together with associated structures around the house and in Serlby Park.  The other listed buildings are in or around the village, and most of them are houses, cottages and associated structures, farmhouses and farm buildings.  The other listed buildings include a church and items in the churchyard, a hotel and public houses, bridges, a milestone, a war memorial and a telephone kiosk.


Key

Buildings

References

Citations

Sources

 

Lists of listed buildings in Nottinghamshire